Mirza Ghalib College (MGC) is a government-aided minority college in Gaya, Bihar, India offering courses in various subjects up to post graduation (in arts, science, commerce). It was established in year 1969 and is affiliated to Magadh University, Bodh Gaya.

History 
Efforts of philanthropists Khan Bahadur Abdul Hafeez (Founder President) and Abdus Salam (Founder Secretary), Mirza Ghalib College, Gaya, a Government Aided Muslim Minority P.G. Unit of Magadh University, Bodh-Gaya, Bihar, came into existence in 1969, centenary year of Mirza Asadullah Begh Khan Ghalib, a great Urdu poet. Khan Bahadur Abdul Hafeez was a retired Deputy Commissioner of Excise of North Bihar under the British government. He received his title of Khan Bahadur from the British Government for his exceptional work and report of the toddy survey of Bihar.

Ever since its establishment, the college has been imparting education in the faculties of Science, Arts and Commerce up to the graduation level. The State Government has granted permanent affiliation in Science, Arts & Commerce up to Degree level. The college also provides Post Graduation education in Botany, Chemistry, Zoology and Psychology. This UGC-enlisted college also offers vocational courses in Computer Application, Management and Interdisciplinary Biotechnology (B.C.A., B.B.M. & Bachelor of Biotechnology Hons.). It has the distinction of being the first college in the Magadh division of Bihar to start Biotechnology course in 2005. This college has a well developed infrastructure in terms of faculty, library and laboratories for imparting quality education to its students. Some major departments of this college have provision of seminar library. This college has separate arrangement for the education of girl students in the morning shift.

Departments 
English
Hindi
Persian
Urdu
Botany
Chemistry
Mathematics
Physics
Zoology
Ancient history
Economics
Geography 
History 
Philosophy 
Political science 
Psychology 
Sociology
BBM
BCA
Bio-Technology

Facilities 
Indoor Games	
Common Rooms for Teachers
Hostels
sports facility
canteen for Students
library

References

External Links 
 
 

Universities and colleges in Bihar
Education in Gaya, India
Ghalib
1969 establishments in Bihar
Educational institutions established in 1969